III is the third studio album by American singer and songwriter Banks, released on July 12, 2019, by Harvest Records. It was preceded by the release of three singles, "Gimme", "Look What You're Doing to Me", and "Contaminated". The album peaked at number 21 on the Billboard 200.

Background
Banks revealed the album name along with its release month in an interview with Billboard, published on May 24, 2019. The album was almost titled Eros, but Banks chose the name III to convey the "beginning, middle, and end" of a part of her life. The album cover was revealed on May 30, 2019. She released the track listing on Twitter on June 11. Banks began The III Tour in support of the album in September 2019.

Singles
"Gimme" was released as the album's lead single on April 29, 2019, and debuted on Zane Lowe's Beats 1 radio show. The song was written by Banks and Josiah Sherman and produced by BJ Burton, Hudson Mohawke and Kito.

"Look What You're Doing to Me" was released as the album's second single on June 11, 2019, along with a lyric video, and features American pop project Francis and the Lights.

"Contaminated" was released as the album's third single on July 10, 2019. Banks released a sample of the track as well as the release date on July 9, 2019.

Critical reception

III received positive reviews from music critics. At Metacritic, which assigns a normalized rating out of 100 to reviews from mainstream publications, the album received an average score of 76, based on 11 reviews. Narzra Ahmed of Clash stated "III is definitely a progression for her as an artist. The more upbeat tracks are interspersed among softer, more delicate, heartfelt ones that represent the duality of her personality and also increase its replay value". Rhys Harding of The Line of Best Fit commented, "Overall, Banks has taken a step forward in her development as an artist, and you can hear this increase in maturity across each album. At times, her evolution is not as convincing as other artists on her level, though the quality of the songwriting here generally makes up for that".

From NME, Nick Levine concluded that "III is probably a couple of tracks too long, but Banks has created another supremely intriguing musical world filled with ear-snagging lyrics and quirky production flourishes: the lone dog-bark sound effect before the final chorus of 'Gimme' is a classic Banks touch. It's difficult to avoid the conclusion: 'that bitch' is a pretty apt description for her after all". Will Hermes of Rolling Stone wrote, "Banks clearly encouraged them [her collaborators] to swing for the fences: The distressed sonics get as extreme as Low got on last year's Double Negative, albeit in much different context. It's thrilling, gutting stuff". Roisin O'Connor from The Independent viewed III as "Banks's most cohesive album to date because she's no longer restricting herself to exploring one feeling at a time".

Track listing

Notes
  signifies a main and vocal producer
  signifies an additional producer
  signifies a co-producer
  signifies a vocal producer

Personnel
Credits adapted from the liner notes of III.

Musicians

 Banks – vocals
 BJ Burton – synthesizers ; drums ; programming ; drum programming ; arrangement ; guitar ; piano ; bass 
 Sohn – synthesizers ; bass ; drums 
 Hudson Mohawke – synthesizers, drum programming ; 808 bass; programming 
 Mark McGee – programming 
 Jake Hanson – guitar 
 Ben Lester – pedal steel guitar 
 Trevor Hagen – trumpet 
 Nick Sanborn – synthesizers, bass 
 Lazerbeak – programming 
 Buddy Ross – keyboards ; bass ; drums ; piano ; Wurlitzer, strings ; synthesizers ; string arrangement 
 Jake Luppen – electric guitar 
 Chais Kinder – electric guitar ; drums, synthesizer 
 Aliyah Hernandez – vocals 
 Jami Hernandez – vocals 
 Francis Farewell Starlite – vocals, piano, table drums 
 Paul Epworth – keyboards, bass 
 Aron Forbes – acoustic guitar 
 Rob Moose – string arrangements ; strings 
 Simon Edward Christensen  Psymun – drum programming (claps), vocal chop/background 
 JT Bates – drums 
 Georgie Banks Feil – vocals 
 Owen Pallett – string arrangement, violin, viola 
 Amy Laing – cello

Technical

 BJ Burton – production ; vocal production ; engineering ; additional production ; executive production
 Sohn – additional production ; production 
 Hudson Mohawke – production, engineering ; co-production 
 Kito – co-production 
 Ross Birchard – engineering 
 Buddy Ross – engineering ; production ; additional production 
 Aron Forbes – engineering ; vocal production ; additional production 
 Sam Tusa – engineering assistance 
 Tim Anderson – vocal production 
 Jesse Ward – production 
 Tom Kahre – engineering 
 Nathaniel Alford – engineering ; vocal production 
 John DeBold – engineering assistance 
 Francis Farewell Starlite – production 
 Paul Epworth – co-production 
 Luke Pickering – engineering assistance 
 Psymun – co-production 
 Jillian Banks – executive production
 Tom Elmhirst – mixing
 Brandon Bost – engineering for mix
 Huntley Miller – mastering 
 Randy Merrill – mastering

Artwork
 J & Associates – artwork
 Steph Wilson – photography

Charts

Tour

Setlist
 "Till Now"
 "Fuck with Myself" (From the artist's second studio album, The Altar)
 "Stroke"
 "Drowning" (From the artist's debut album, Goddess)
 "Waiting Game" (From the artist's debut album, Goddess)
 "Ode to the Grey Zone" (From the artist's poetry book)
 "Contaminated"
 "Hawaiian Mazes"
 "Alaska"
 "Propaganda"
 "Poltergeist" (From the artist's second studio album, The Altar)
 "Underdog" (A non-album single)
 "Sawzall"
 "If We Were Made of Water"
 "This Is What It Feels Like" (From the artist's debut album, Goddess)
 "Godless"
 "The Fall"
 "Gimme"
 "Gemini Feed"
 "Beggin for Thread" (From the artist's debut album, Goddess)

Shows

Notes

References

2019 albums
Albums produced by BJ Burton
Albums produced by Hudson Mohawke
Albums produced by Paul Epworth
Albums recorded at Westlake Recording Studios
Banks (singer) albums
Harvest Records albums
Albums recorded at The Church Studios